Richard O'Shea (born 9 March 1945) is an Irish sailor. He competed in the Flying Dutchman event at the 1972 Summer Olympics.

References

External links
 

1945 births
Living people
Irish male sailors (sport)
Olympic sailors of Ireland
Sailors at the 1972 Summer Olympics – Flying Dutchman
Sportspeople from Nairobi